Callionymus amboina, the Ambon darter dragonet, is a species of dragonet native to the Pacific waters around Indonesia where it occurs at depths of from .

References 

A
Fish described in 1965